Delta Apodis (δ Aps, δ Apodis) is the Bayer designation for a double star in the southern constellation of Apus.

The brighter star, δ Apodis, is an M-type red giant and has an apparent magnitude that varies from magnitude +4.66 to +4.87. It is classified as a semiregular variable with pulsations of multiple periods of 68.0, 94.9 and 101.7 days. At an angular separation of 102.9 arcseconds is δ Apodis, an orange K-type giant with an apparent magnitude of +5.27.

Hipparcos data report the distance to δ Apodis to be approximately 760 light years, while δ Apodis is found to be around 610 light years from Earth. They may form a common proper motion pair.

Naming

References

External links
 Image δ Apodis

145366
Apodis, Delta
Apus (constellation)
Double stars
Semiregular variable stars
K-type giants
M-type giants
080047 57
6020
Durchmusterung objects